Diana Sacayán (December 31, 1975 – October 11, 2015) was an Argentinian LGBT activist who fought for the legal rights of transgender people in Argentina.

Biography 
Amancay Diana Sacayán was born in Tucumán on December 31, 1975. Her ancestors were Diaguita. At young age, her family moved to Gregorio de Laferrère, Buenos Aires. She led a life of poverty with her 15 siblings.

Activism 
Diana Sacayán came out as transgender at the age of seventeen. Her human rights were violated several times since then. She was arrested different times and at jail she leaned towards the Communist Party. However, on 2011, she left the Communist Party and created the Anti-Discrimination Movement of Liberation (MAL), a non-governmental organization. This organization was working against all forms of discrimination. They also emphasized on empowering LGBTI people in different sector including creating awareness for their human rights.

As the president of MAL, she was responsible for the project of non-discriminatory policies in the health institutions of La Matanza Partido. This project was aimed to include transgender and transsexual people in health system. She also worked for raising awareness between transgender and transsexual people for their rights. Her active contribution led the recognition of regulation for self-perceived gender identities by the State. It turned the main precedents of the National Gender Identity Law. Sacayán served on the board of the International Lesbian, Gay, Bisexual, Trans and Intersex Association and led the Antidiscrimination Liberation Movement in Argentina.

In 2012, she ran for the position of Ombudsman of La Matanza Partido, becoming the first transgender candidate for such a position. She was able to be one of three most-voted candidates in that election. On the same year, she received her national identity card as a woman personally from the Former president of Argentina, Cristina Fernández de Kirchner.

Death 
Diana was brutally murdered in October 2015. Her murder incident generated a commotion and a high social impact, especially in the human rights movements and the LGBTQ+ community. The person who killed her, Gabriel David Marino, was subsequently sentenced to life in prison in 2018. For the first time in history, the Argentine Justice acknowledged that the murder was "a hate crime against the travesti identity", known as "travesticide" or "transvesticide" (Spanish: travesticidio; a portmanteau of "travesti" and "homicide"). The ruling was widely celebrated by LGBT activists and has been considered "one more example of the [social] changes underway in Argentina."

Writings 
La gesta del nombre propio (2006), 
Cumbia, copeteo y lágrimas (2008), 
Blog de Movimiento Antidiscriminatorio de Liberación (M. A. L.)

References

Argentine people of Diaguita descent
Argentine LGBT rights activists
Argentine transgender people
Argentine activists
Argentine women activists
Violence against trans women
Transgender women
1975 births
2015 deaths
2015 murders in Argentina
People murdered in Argentina
October 2015 crimes in South America
Victims of anti-LGBT hate crimes
Women civil rights activists
21st-century Argentine LGBT people